Heaven to Betsy (1945) is the fifth volume in the Betsy-Tacy series by Maud Hart Lovelace. Heaven to Betsy, describing Betsy's first year in high school,  is written for an older age group than the earlier Betsy-Tacy books. The book, along with the entire Betsy-Tacy and Deep Valley series, was republished in 2000 by HarperTrophy with a new cover art illustrated by Michael Koelsch.

Background 
The events of the novel span Betsy and Tacy's freshman, or ninth-grade, year of school. A major character is added to the series' cast when Betsy meets Joe Willard, an orphan working for his aunt and uncle in their store at Butternut Center. The story differs from the first four books, by expanding the Betsy-Tacy-Tib circle to "The Crowd," a group of boys and girls that frequently meet at Betsy's house.  Although Joe Willard was based on Maud Hart Lovelace's husband, Delos Lovelace, the book concentrates more on Betsy's adventures with the Crowd, including her self-described first love, Tony Markham, and the effect of the Crowd on Betsy's burgeoning talent for writing.

References

Betsy-Tacy
1945 American novels
Novels set in Minnesota
Novels about writers
1945 children's books
Thomas Y. Crowell Co. books